Michael Andrew Carrington (born Michael Andrew Chuprin-Plicha, 5 May 1961), is an Australian broadcast media executive who is currently Director, Entertainment and Specialist at the ABC based in Sydney, New South Wales. He oversees all national radio, television, and digital services including ABC TV (ABC1), ABC TV Plus (ABC2), ABC ME, ABC Kids plus ABC iview, ABC Listen, ABC Kids Listen, ABC Classic FM, ABC Jazz, ABC Country, and Radio National.

Early life
Of Russian and English descent, Carrington was born in 1961 in Camden, New South Wales, Australia to Hubert John Plicha and Elaine Marshall. The family lived in Campbelltown, New South Wales until 1974 when they moved to Parkes, New South Wales, where Carrington attended Parkes High School graduating in 1979.

Carrington's father was born Vitalik Aleksandrovich Chuprin in Rostov-on-Don, Russia and is a direct descendant of Jacob Wiens, a co-founder of the Mennonites. Carrington's paternal grandmother, Margarita Chuprin (née Wiens) had remarried after World War II and his father's name was changed by adoption. They emigrated to Australia, sailing on the Fairsea, departing Naples, Italy 3 December 1949, and arriving in Sydney on New Year's Eve.

Career
After working as a DJ on Radio Station 2PK in Australia, he joined the Royal Australian Navy as a communications sailor. Following a four-year commission he joined the children's department at Network Ten in Sydney, where he worked on the magazine show Ridgey Didge and the game shows Double Dare and Family Double Dare. On immigrating to the United Kingdom in 1990, he joined the Bought Films Unit at BBC television. A year later he joined the Discovery Channel Europe as an acquisitions executive. He was appointed deputy head of programme acquisitions in 1993 for BBC Children's Television, latterly seconded to research and develop broadcast strategy for CBBC and CBeebies with the deputy director of television, David Docherty. In May 2000 he joined LEGO TV & Film as Head of Television and New Media, responsible for programme development and production, where he was co-executive producer on Little Robots. In 2004 he joined the BBC as head of animation & acquisitions, where he gained broadcast rights over Lunar Jim, The Koala Brothers and LazyTown. He commissioned a variety of UK-made animation series including Charlie and Lola, Shaun the Sheep, The Snow Queen, Timmy Time and The Secret Show.

In May 2006, the commissioning of the BBC's Children services was split into two and Carrington was appointed the controller of CBeebies, taking responsibility for all the channels output across Radio, Television and Online; commissioning award-winning programmes like In the Night Garden..., Something Special and Waybuloo. Carrington cast CBeebies' first disabled presenter, Cerrie Burnell, as a permanent member of the presenting team in 2009.

In April 2010, Carrington was appointed chief content officer for Cartoon Network EMEA at Turner Broadcasting System Europe, and General Manager of TBS Studios Arabia. He also served as chairman of the Turner LazyTown Operational Board, and was executive producer of LazyTown and The Amazing World of Gumball. Carrington joined HIT Entertainment in February 2013 to oversee its content slate, Thomas the Tank Engine, Bob the Builder, Fireman Sam, and Mike the Knight globally. In July 2014 it was announced that Carrington was appointed CEO of UK production company The Foundation, which became part of Zodiak Kids Studios in April 2015, as well as Marathon Media and Tele-Images Productions each based in France. Carrington led the Zodiak Kids Studios umbrella brand as its CEO, before moving to ABC-TV in Sydney. At MIPCOM in October 2017, Carrington was awarded with the World Screen Kids Trendsetter Award for his contribution to the global children's media industry.

Organizations
Michael Carrington is a founder patron of the Children's Media Foundation and serves on the advisory committee for the Children's Media Conference. He is a member of the British Academy of Film and Television Arts (BAFTA), a member of the Royal Television Society, Australian Film Institute and the International Academy of Television Arts and Sciences.

References

External links
 Michael Carrington Biography
 Children's Media Foundation
 
 
 Who's Who
 Zodiak Kids Studios
 ABC Children

1961 births
Living people
Businesspeople from Sydney
Royal Australian Navy sailors
Australian expatriates in the United Kingdom
British television executives
BBC executives
Australian people of Russian descent
Australian people of English descent
Australian television executives